Peyton Gordon (April 30, 1870 – September 17, 1946) was an Associate Justice of the District Court of the United States for the District of Columbia.

Education and career

Born in Washington, D.C., Gordon received a Bachelor of Laws from Columbian University School of Law (now George Washington University Law School) in 1890 and a Master of Laws from the same institution in 1891. He was an Assistant United States Attorney for the District of Columbia from 1891 to 1904. He was the Pardon Attorney from 1904 to 1907. He was a special assistant to the United States Attorney General from 1907 to 1913. He was in private practice in Washington, D.C. from 1914 to 1917. He was in the United States Army JAG Corps from 1917 to 1918, and then returned to private practice in Washington, D.C. until 1921. He served as the United States Attorney for the District of Columbia from 1921 to 1928.

Federal judicial service

Gordon was nominated by President Calvin Coolidge on February 27, 1928, to an Associate Justice seat on the Supreme Court of the District of Columbia (District Court of the United States for the District of Columbia from June 25, 1936, now the United States District Court for the District of Columbia) vacated by Associate Justice Adolph A. Hoehling Jr. He was confirmed by the United States Senate on March 29, 1928, and received his commission the same day. He assumed senior status on February 4, 1941. His service terminated on September 17, 1946, due to his death in Washington, D.C.

References

Sources
 

1870 births
1946 deaths
Lawyers from Washington, D.C.
Military personnel from Washington, D.C.
Judges of the United States District Court for the District of Columbia
United States district court judges appointed by Calvin Coolidge
20th-century American judges
United States Army officers
United States Attorneys for the District of Columbia
Assistant United States Attorneys